Alonzo Victor Lewis (1886–1946) was an American artist. He is primarily known for public sculptures in the State of Washington; he also painted in the Impressionist style.

Born in Utah, Lewis studied at the Art Institute of Chicago, then moved for a time to Spokane, Washington before settling in Seattle in 1912.

Partial list of works
44 sculptures for Education Hall (now Miller Hall), University of Washington, Seattle. 1922.
The First World Flight monument, Sand Point Air Field (now Magnuson Park), Seattle. 1924 
American Doughboy Bringing Home Victory, Seattle Center, Seattle, now located at Evergreen Washelli Memorial Park.
Winged Victory, Washington State Capitol, Olympia, Washington. Dedicated 1938.
Abraham Lincoln memorial sculpture, Spokane, Washington.
Dr. Mark A. Matthews, 1942 sculpture of Mark A. Matthews, Denny Park, Seattle.
The Prospector, Sitka, Alaska. Modeled in clay no later than 1942. Posthumously cast in bronze, dedicated 1949.

Notes

External links

Photo of Lewis, circa 1927

1886 births
1946 deaths
20th-century American painters
20th-century American sculptors
20th-century American male artists
American male painters
American male sculptors
Artists from Washington (state)
School of the Art Institute of Chicago alumni
Sculptors from Utah
Sculptors from Washington (state)